The Screen Award for Best Actress (Critics) is an Indian cinema award.

Winners

 Winners are listed first in bold, followed by the other nominees.

 2020– Taapsee Pannu (tied with) Bhumi Pednekar – Saand Ki Aankh
 Priyanka Chopra – The Sky Is Pink
 Bhumi Pednekar – Bala
 Richa Chadda – Section 375

See also
 Screen Awards
 Bollywood
 Cinema of India

References

Screen Awards
Film awards for lead actress